Harka Raj Sampang Rai (or Harka Sampang) is a Nepalese politician and the current mayor of Dharan. Rai is also a social activist. He has been elected as an independent candidate for the post Mayor, having 'Walking stick/Lauro' as the electoral symbol via the 2022 local election. He defeated Nepali Congress candidate Kishore Rai by receiving 20,821 votes.

Early life and education 
Rai was born in Khartamchha, Khotang which is in present day Kepilasgadhi rural municipality. His father was a former British Gurkha soldier. He moved to Dharan in 1998 after completing his SLC examinations to pursue higher education. He graduated from Mahendra Multiple Campus in Dharan and started work as a tutor. After completing his higher education he had gone to Iraq and Afghanistan for employment.

Political career 
Rai contested the 2019 by-elections for the mayor of Dharan as an independent but only managed to get 422 votes. He again contested for the post of mayor at the 2022 elections still as an independent and was elected after getting a vote share of 39.8%.

Activism 
After six years working abroad he returned to Dharan and opened the National Unity Network to protest against corruption. He was also involved in protests against tax raises, illegal sand extraction from rivers and the water scarcity in Dharan. In 2016, Rai became the coordinator of people displaced by the expansion of the Madan Bhandari Inner Terai Highway.

Electoral history

2022 Dharan municipal election

References

Living people
People from Sunsari District
Mayors of places in Nepal
Nepalese activists
21st-century Nepalese politicians
1983 births